Emin Khoja, also Amīn Khoja, Emin Khwaja, was a Uighur leader from Turfan who revolted against the Mongol Buddhist Dzungar Khanate in 1720, while the Dzungars under Tsewang Rabtan were being attacked by the Qing dynasty in the Dzungar–Qing Wars. Emin Khoja also submitted to the Qing. Uighur Muslims like Emin Khoja from Turfan revolted against their Dzungar Buddhist rulers and pledged allegiance to Qing China to deliver them from Dzungar Buddhist rule. The Qing eventually eliminated the Dzungars in the Dzungar genocide. Emin Khoja was "arguably the most prominent Muslim collaborator in the Qing imperial expansion into Central Asia".

Emin Khoja also allied with the Qing to crush the Revolt of the Altishahr Khojas led by Burhan-ud-din and Khan Khoja, and drove them to Badakhshan. The Qing armies reached far in Central Asia and came to the outskirts of Tashkent while the Kazakh rulers made their submissions as vassals to the Qing.

Emin Khoja received the official nobiliary Chinese title of Fuguo gong (辅国公, "Duke Who Assists to the State"). He was left as semi-autonomous ruler of Turpan and later appointed as ruler of Yarkand in the newly created province of Nan-lu (Southern Road) in 1760.

The Emin Minaret was built by his son and successor Suleiman in 1777 in the memory of his father. It is the tallest minaret in China.

References

Uyghur people